Devario suvatti is a freshwater fish endemic to Thailand.

References

Fish of Myanmar
Fish described in 1939
Devario